The 72nd Primetime Creative Arts Emmy Awards honored the best in artistic and technical achievement in American prime time television programming from June 1, 2019, until May 31, 2020, as chosen by the Academy of Television Arts & Sciences. The awards were presented across five ceremonies; the first four were held on September 14 through 17, 2020, and were streamed online, while the fifth was held on September 19 and broadcast on FXX. They were presented in a virtual ceremony due to the COVID-19 pandemic; Nicole Byer hosted the event. A total of 106 Creative Arts Emmys were presented across 100 categories. The ceremonies preceded the 72nd Primetime Emmy Awards, held on September 20.

The Mandalorian and Watchmen led all programs with seven wins each, followed by Saturday Night Live with six and RuPaul's Drag Race with five. Watchmen was also the most-nominated program with 15 nominations; The Mandalorian followed with 14, while The Marvelous Mrs. Maisel and Saturday Night Live each received 12. Overall program awards went to 22 shows, including The Apollo, Bad Education, The Cave, Cheer, Dave Chappelle: Sticks & Stones, Jim Henson's The Dark Crystal: Age of Resistance, The Last Dance, Leah Remini: Scientology and the Aftermath, Live in Front of a Studio Audience, Queer Eye, Rick and Morty, Saturday Night Live, and We Are the Dream, among others. Netflix led all networks with 124 nominations; it also tied with HBO for the most wins, as each received 19 awards.

Winners and nominees

Winners are listed first, highlighted in boldface, and indicated with a double dagger (‡). Sections are based upon the categories listed in the 2019–2020 Emmy rules and procedures. Area awards and juried awards are denoted next to the category names as applicable. For simplicity, producers who received nominations for program awards have been omitted.

Programs
{| class="wikitable"
|+ 
|-
| style="vertical-align:top;" width="50%" | 
 Bad Education (HBO) American Son (Netflix)
 Dolly Parton's Heartstrings: These Old Bones (Netflix)
 El Camino: A Breaking Bad Movie (Netflix)
 Unbreakable Kimmy Schmidt: Kimmy vs the Reverend (Netflix)
| style="vertical-align:top;" width="50%" | 
 Saturday Night Live (NBC) A Black Lady Sketch Show (HBO)
 Drunk History (Comedy Central)
|-
| style="vertical-align:top;" width="50%" | 
 Live in Front of a Studio Audience: "All in the Family" and "Good Times" (ABC) 77th Annual Golden Globe Awards (NBC)
 The Oscars (ABC)
 Super Bowl LIV Halftime Show Starring Jennifer Lopez and Shakira (Fox)
 73rd Annual Tony Awards (CBS)
| style="vertical-align:top;" width="50%" | 
 Dave Chappelle: Sticks & Stones (Netflix) Dave Chappelle: The Kennedy Center Mark Twain Prize for American Humor (PBS)
 Hannah Gadsby: Douglas (Netflix)
 Jerry Seinfeld: 23 Hours to Kill (Netflix)
 John Mulaney & the Sack Lunch Bunch (Netflix)
 Tiffany Haddish: Black Mitzvah (Netflix)
|-
| style="vertical-align:top;" width="50%" | 
 Jim Henson's The Dark Crystal: Age of Resistance (Netflix) We Are the Dream: The Kids of the Oakland MLK Oratorical Fest (HBO) Star Wars Resistance (Disney Channel)
| style="vertical-align:top;" width="50%" | 
 Rick and Morty: "The Vat of Acid Episode" (Adult Swim) Big Mouth: "Disclosure the Movie: The Musical!" (Netflix)
 Bob's Burgers: "Pig Trouble in Little Tina" (Fox)
 BoJack Horseman: "The View from Halfway Down" (Netflix)
 The Simpsons: "Thanksgiving of Horror" (Fox)
|-
| style="vertical-align:top;" width="50%" | 
 Queer Eye (Netflix) Antiques Roadshow (PBS)
 Love Is Blind (Netflix)
 Shark Tank (ABC)
 A Very Brady Renovation (HGTV)
| style="vertical-align:top;" width="50%" | 
 Cheer (Netflix) Amy Schumer Learns to Cook: Lunch Break and Pasta Night (Food Network)
 Kevin Hart: Don't F**k This Up (Netflix)
 RuPaul's Drag Race: Untucked (VH1)
 We're Here (HBO)
|-
| style="vertical-align:top;" width="50%" | 
 The Last Dance (ESPN) American Masters (PBS)
 Hillary (Hulu)
 McMillion$ (HBO)
 Tiger King: Murder, Mayhem and Madness (Netflix)
| style="vertical-align:top;" width="50%" | 
 The Apollo (HBO) Beastie Boys Story (Apple TV+)
 Becoming (Netflix)
 The Great Hack (Netflix)
 Laurel Canyon: A Place in Time (Epix)
|-
| style="vertical-align:top;" width="50%" | 
 Leah Remini: Scientology and the Aftermath (A&E) Comedians in Cars Getting Coffee (Netflix)
 Ugly Delicious (Netflix)
 Vice (Showtime)
 The World According to Jeff Goldblum (Disney+)
| style="vertical-align:top;" width="50%" | 
 The Cave (National Geographic) Chasing the Moon (American Experience) (PBS)
 Moonlight Sonata: Deafness in Three Movements (HBO)
 One Child Nation (Prime Video)
|-
| style="vertical-align:top;" width="50%" | 
 Better Call Saul Employee Training: Legal Ethics with Kim Wexler (AMC.com) The Good Place Presents: The Selection (NBC)
 Most Dangerous Game (Quibi)
 Reno 911! (Quibi)
 Star Trek: Short Treks (CBS All Access)
| style="vertical-align:top;" width="50%" | 
 Carpool Karaoke: The Series (Apple TV) Beeing at Home with Samantha Bee (TBS)
 Between Two Ferns with Zach Galifianakis: The Movie, Sorta Uncut Interviews (Netflix)
 Jimmy Kimmel's Quarantine Minilogues (YouTube/JimmyKimmelLive)
 The Randy Rainbow Show (YouTube)
|-
| style="vertical-align:top;" width="50%" | 
 National Geographic Presents: Creating Cosmos: Possible Worlds (National Geographic) Between The Scenes – The Daily Show (Comedy Central)
 Full Frontal with Samantha Bee Presents: Pandemic Video Diaries (TBS)
 Pose: Identity, Family, Community (FX)
 RuPaul's Drag Race Out Of The Closet (VH1)
| style="vertical-align:top;" width="50%" | 
 Forky Asks a Question: What Is Love? (Disney+) Robot Chicken: "Santa's Dead (Spoiler Alert) Holiday Murder Thing Special" (Adult Swim)
 Steven Universe Future: "Fragments" (Cartoon Network)
|-
| style="vertical-align:top;" width="50%" | 
 The Messy Truth VR Experience (Oculus) Rebuilding Notre Dame (Oculus)
 When We Stayed Home (Oculus)
| style="vertical-align:top;" width="50%" | 
 Big Mouth Guide to Life (Netflix) Doctor Who: The Runaway (BBC America)
|-
| style="vertical-align:top;" width="50%" | 
 Mr. Robot: Season_4.0 ARG (USA Network) Stranger Things: Scoops Ahoy: Operation Scoop Snoop (Netflix)
 Westworld: Free Will is Not Free Interactive Experience (HBO)
| style="vertical-align:top;" width="50%" | 
 Create Together (YouTube) The Line (Oculus)|}

Performing

Animation
{| class="wikitable"
|+ 
|-
| style="vertical-align:top;" | 
 Archer: "Road Trip" – Jill Dykxhoorn (FX) Cosmos: Possible Worlds: "Vavilov" – Dan MacKenzie (National Geographic) Genndy Tartakovsky's Primal: "A Cold Death" – Stephen DeStefano (Adult Swim) Genndy Tartakovsky's Primal: "Spear and Fang" – Genndy Tartakovsky (Adult Swim) Genndy Tartakovsky's Primal: "Spear and Fang" – Scott Wills (Adult Swim)|}

Art Direction
{| class="wikitable"
|+ 
|-
| style="vertical-align:top;" width="50%" | 
 The Handmaid's Tale: "Household" – Elisabeth Williams, Martha Sparrow, and Robert Hepburn (Hulu) Big Little Lies: "What Have They Done?" / "The Bad Mother" / "I Want To Know" – John Paino, Austin Gorg, and Amy Wells (HBO)
 Killing Eve: "Are You from Pinner?" – Laurence Dorman, Beckie Harvey, and Casey Williams (BBC America)
 The Morning Show: "In the Dark Night of the Soul It's Always 3:30 in the Morning" – John Paino, James F. Truesdale, and Amy Wells (Apple TV+)
 Ozark: "Wartime" – David Bomba, Sean Ryan Jennings, and Kim Leoleis (Netflix)
 Succession: "This Is Not for Tears" – Stephen H. Carter, Carmen Cardenas, George DeTitta, and Ana Buljan (HBO)
| style="vertical-align:top;" width="50%" | 
 The Crown: "Aberfan" – Martin Childs, Mark Raggett, and Alison Harvey (Netflix) Hollywood – Matthew Flood Ferguson, Mark Robert Taylor, and Melissa Licht (Netflix)
 The Marvelous Mrs. Maisel: "It's Comedy or Cabbage" / "A Jewish Girl Walks Into the Apollo..." – Bill Groom, Neil Prince, and Ellen Christiansen (Prime Video)
 Watchmen: "An Almost Religious Awe" – Kristian Milsted, Jay Pelissier, and Edward McLoughlin (HBO)
 Westworld: "Parce Domine" – Howard Cummings, Jon Carlos, and Julie Ochipinti (HBO)
|-
| style="vertical-align:top;" width="50%" | 
 The Mandalorian: "Chapter 1: The Mandalorian" – Andrew L. Jones, Jeff Wisniewski, and Amanda Serino (Disney+) GLOW: "Up, Up, Up" – Todd Fjelsted, Valerie Green, and Cynthia Slagter (Netflix)
 Space Force: "The Launch" – Susie Mancini, Gary Warshaw, and Rachael Ferrara (Netflix)
 What We Do in the Shadows: "Resurrection" / "Collaboration" / "Witches" – Kate Bunch, Aleks Cameron, and Shayne Fox (FX)
 Will & Grace: "We Love Lucy" – Glenda Rovello, Conny Boettger-Marinos, and Peter Gurski (NBC)
| style="vertical-align:top;" width="50%" | 
 Saturday Night Live: "Host: Eddie Murphy" / "Host: John Mulaney" – Eugene Lee, Akira Yoshimura, Keith Ian Raywood, and N. Joseph DeTullio (NBC) At Home with Amy Sedaris: "Outdoor Entertaining" / "Travel" – Jason Singleton, Katy Porter, and Naomi Munro (truTV)
 Drunk History: "Bad Blood" – Monica Sotto, Rae Deslich, and Linette McCown (Comedy Central)
 Last Week Tonight with John Oliver: "Episode 629" – Eric Morrell and Amanda Carzoli (HBO)
 Queer Eye: "We're in Japan!: The Ideal Woman" – Thomas Rouse (Netflix)
|-
| style="vertical-align:top;" width="50%" colspan="2" | 
 The Oscars – Jason Sherwood and Alana Billingsley (ABC) 77th Annual Golden Globe Awards – Brian Stonestreet and Angel Herrera (NBC)
 62nd Grammy Awards – Brian Stonestreet, Kristen Merlino, Gloria Lamb, and Jason Howard (CBS)
 The Little Mermaid Live! – Misty Buckley, Joe Celli, and Jason Howard (ABC)
 Live in Front of a Studio Audience: "All in the Family" and "Good Times" – Bernard Vyzga, Richard Rohrer, and Ron Olsen (ABC)
|}

Casting
{| class="wikitable"
|+ 
|-
| style="vertical-align:top;" width="50%" | 
 Schitt's Creek – Lisa Parasyn and Jon Comerford (Pop TV) Curb Your Enthusiasm – Allison Jones and Ben Harris (HBO)
 Dead to Me – Sherry Thomas, Russell Scott, and Sharon Bialy (Netflix)
 Insecure – Victoria Thomas and Matthew Maisto (HBO)
 The Marvelous Mrs. Maisel – Cindy Tolan (Prime Video)
 What We Do in the Shadows – Gayle Keller, Jenny Lewis, and Sara Kay (FX)
| style="vertical-align:top;" width="50%" | 
 Succession – Avy Kaufman (HBO) Big Little Lies – David Rubin (HBO)
 The Crown – Nina Gold and Robert Sterne (Netflix)
 The Handmaid's Tale – Sharon Bialy, Sherry Thomas, Russell Scott, and Robin D. Cook (Hulu)
 Killing Eve – Gilly Poole and Suzanne Crowley (BBC America)
 Ozark – Alexa L. Fogel, Tara Feldstein Bennett, and Chase Paris (Netflix)
|-
| style="vertical-align:top;" width="50%" | 
 Watchmen – Victoria Thomas and Meagan Lewis (HBO) Mrs. America – Carmen Cuba and Robin D. Cook (FX)
 Normal People – Louise Kiely (Hulu)
 Unbelievable – Laura Rosenthal, Jodi Angstreich, Kate Caldwell, and Melissa Kostenbauder (Netflix)
 Unorthodox – Esther King, Vicki Thomson, Maria Rölcke, and Cornelia Mareth (Netflix)
| style="vertical-align:top;" width="50%" | 
 RuPaul's Drag Race – Goloka Bolte and Ethan Petersen (VH1) Born This Way – Sasha Alpert, Megan Sleeper, and Caitlyn Audet (A&E)
 Love Is Blind – Donna Driscoll, Kelly Zack Castillo, and Megan Feldman (Netflix)
 Queer Eye – Danielle Gervais, Beyhan Oguz, Pamela Vallarelli, Ally Capriotti Grant, and Hana Sakata (Netflix)
 The Voice – Michelle McNulty, Holly Dale, and Courtney Burns (NBC)
|}

Choreography
{| class="wikitable"
|+ 
|-
| style="vertical-align:top;" width="50%" | 
 So You Think You Can Dance: "I'll Be Seeing You" / "Mambo Italiano" / "The Girl from Ipanema" – Al Blackstone (Fox) The Oscars: "Come Alive (Opening Sequence)" – Jemel McWilliams (ABC)
 Savage X Fenty Show: "Statues" / "Benches" / "Window" – Parris Goebel (Prime Video)
 So You Think You Can Dance: "Enough Is Enough" / "Sign of the Times" – Travis Wall (Fox)
 World of Dance: "Dos Jueyes" / "El Ray Timbal" – Jefferson Benjumea and Adrianita Avila (NBC)
| style="vertical-align:top;" width="50%" | 
 Zoey's Extraordinary Playlist: "All I Do Is Win" / "I've Got the Music in Me" / "Crazy" – Mandy Moore (NBC)|}

Cinematography

Commercial

Costumes

Directing

Hairstyling
{| class="wikitable"
|+ 
|-
| style="vertical-align:top;" width="50%" | 
 Black-ish: "Hair Day" – Araxi Lindsey, Robert C. Mathews III, and Enoch Williams (ABC) Grace and Frankie: "The Laughing Stock" – Kelly Kline, Jonathan Hanousek, and Marlene Williams (Netflix)
 The Handmaid's Tale: "Liars" – Paul Elliot and Ewa Latak-Cynk (Hulu)
 The Politician: "Pilot" – Chris Clark, Natalie Driscoll, and Havana Prats (Netflix)
 Schitt's Creek: "Happy Ending" – Annastasia Cucullo and Ana Sorys (Pop TV)
 This Is Us: "Strangers: Part Two" – Michael Peter Reitz, Katherine Rees, Germicka Barclay, Renia Green-Edittorio, and Corey Hill (NBC)
| style="vertical-align:top;" width="50%" | 
 Hollywood: "A Hollywood Ending" – Michelle Ceglia, Barry Lee Moe, George Guzman, Michele Arvizo, and Maria Elena Pantoja (Netflix) The Crown: "Cri de Coeur" – Cate Hall, Louise Coles, Sarah Nuth, Suzanne David, and Catriona Johnstone (Netflix)
 The Marvelous Mrs. Maisel: "A Jewish Girl Walks Into the Apollo..." – Kimberley Spiteri, Michael S. Ward, and Tijen Osman (Prime Video)
 Pose: "Worth It" – Barry Lee Moe, Timothy Harvey, Sabana Majeed, Liliana Maggio, Lisa Thomas, Greg Bazemore, Jessie Mojica, and Charlene Belmond (FX)
 Star Trek: Picard: "Stardust City Rag" – Maxine Morris, Maria Sandoval, Wendy Southard, Sallie Nicole Ciganovich, Ashleigh Childers, and Yesim Osman (CBS All Access)
|-
| style="vertical-align:top;" width="50%" colspan="2" | 
 RuPaul's Drag Race: "I'm That Bitch" – Curtis Foreman and Ryan Randall (VH1)'''
 A Celebration of the Music from Coco – Jennifer Guerrero, Yvonne Kupka, Kimi Messina, Gail Ryan, Amber Maher, Yiotis Panayiotou, and Megg Massey (Disney+)
 Dancing with the Stars: "Episode 2802" – Mary Guerrero, Kimi Messina, Gail Ryan, Cheryl Eckert, Jennifer Guerrero, Jani Kleinbard, Amber Maher, and Patricia Pineda (ABC)
 The Oscars – Anthony Wilson, Barbara Cantu, Paula Ashby, Vickie Mynes, Yvonne Kupka, Gail Ryan, Iraina Crenshaw, and Luke O'Connor (ABC)
 The Voice: "Top 10" – Jerilynn Stephens, Amber Maher, Regina Rodriguez, Renee Ferruggia, Darbie Wieczorek, Cory Rotenberg, Danilo Dixon, and Robert Ramos (NBC)
|}

Lighting Design / Lighting Direction

Main Title and Motion Design

Makeup

Music
{| class="wikitable"
|+ 
|-
| style="vertical-align:top;" width="50%" | 
 The Mandalorian: "Chapter 8: Redemption" – Ludwig Göransson (Disney+) The Crown: "Aberfan" – Martin Phipps (Netflix)
 Euphoria: "Bonnie and Clyde" – Labrinth (HBO)
 Ozark: "All In" – Danny Bensi and Saunder Jurriaans (Netflix)
 Succession: "This Is Not for Tears" – Nicholas Britell (HBO)
| style="vertical-align:top;" width="50%" | 
 Watchmen: "It's Summer and We're Running Out of Ice" – Trent Reznor and Atticus Ross (HBO) Hollywood: "Hooray for Hollywood: Part 2" – Nathan Barr (Netflix)
 Little Fires Everywhere: "The Spider Web" – Mark Isham and Isabella Summers (Hulu)
 Mrs. America: "Reagan" – Kris Bowers (FX)
 Unorthodox: "Part 1" – Antonio Gambale (Netflix)
|-
| style="vertical-align:top;" width="50%" | 
 Why We Hate: "Tools & Tactics" – Laura Karpman (Discovery Channel) Becoming – Kamasi Washington (Netflix)
 Home: "Maine" – Amanda Jones (Apple TV+)
 McMillion$: "Episode 1" – Pinar Toprak and Alex Kovacs (HBO)
 Tiger King: Murder, Mayhem and Madness: "Not Your Average Joe" – Mark Mothersbaugh, John Enroth, and Albert Fox (Netflix)
| style="vertical-align:top;" width="50%" | 
 The Kennedy Center Honors – Rickey Minor (CBS) Let's Go Crazy: The Grammy Salute to Prince – Sheila E., Jimmy Jam, and Terry Lewis (CBS)
 The Oscars – Rickey Minor (ABC)
 Saturday Night Live: "SNL at Home #1" – Lenny Pickett, Eli Brueggemann, and Leon Pendarvis (NBC)
 Super Bowl LIV Halftime Show Starring Jennifer Lopez and Shakira – Adam Wayne Blackstone (Fox)
|-
| style="vertical-align:top;" width="50%" | 
 Euphoria: "And Salt the Earth Behind You" – "All for Us" by Labrinth (HBO) The Black Godfather – "Letter to My Godfather" by Pharrell Williams and Chad Hugo (Netflix)
 Last Week Tonight with John Oliver: "Episode 629" – "Eat Shit, Bob" by David Dabbon, Joanna Rothkopf, Jill Twiss, and Seena Vali (HBO)
 Little Fires Everywhere: "Find a Way" – "Build It Up" by Ingrid Michaelson (Hulu)
 The Marvelous Mrs. Maisel: "Strike Up the Band" – "One Less Angel" by Thomas Mizer and Curtis Moore (Prime Video)
 This Is Us: "Strangers" – "Memorized" by Siddhartha Khosla and Taylor Goldsmith (NBC)
 Watchmen: "This Extraordinary Being" – "The Way It Used to Be" by Trent Reznor and Atticus Ross (HBO)
| style="vertical-align:top;" width="50%" | 
 Hollywood – Nathan Barr (Netflix) Carnival Row – Nathan Barr (Prime Video)
 Defending Jacob – Ólafur Arnalds (Apple TV+)
 Unorthodox – Antonio Gambale (Netflix)
 Why We Hate – Laura Karpman (Discovery Channel)
 Wu-Tang: An American Saga – RZA (Hulu)
|-
| style="vertical-align:top;" width="50%" colspan="2" | 
 The Marvelous Mrs. Maisel: "It's Comedy or Cabbage" – Robin Urdang, Amy Sherman-Palladino, and Daniel Palladino (Prime Video)' Better Call Saul: "The Guy for This" – Thomas Golubić (AMC)
 Euphoria: "And Salt the Earth Behind You" – Jen Malone and Adam Leber (HBO)
 Insecure: "Lowkey Movin' On" – Kier Lehman (HBO)
 Killing Eve: "Meetings Have Biscuits" – Catherine Grieves and David Holmes (BBC America)
 Stranger Things: "Chapter Three: The Case of the Missing Lifeguard" – Nora Felder (Netflix)
 Watchmen: "This Extraordinary Being" – Liza Richardson (HBO)
|}

Picture Editing
{| class="wikitable"
|+ 
|-
| style="vertical-align:top;" width="50%" | 
 'Succession: "This Is Not for Tears" – Bill Henry and Venya Bruk (HBO) The Mandalorian: "Chapter 2: The Child" – Andrew S. Eisen (Disney+)
 The Mandalorian: "Chapter 4: Sanctuary" – Dana E. Glauberman and Dylan Firshein (Disney+)
 The Mandalorian: "Chapter 8: Redemption" – Jeff Seibenick (Disney+)
 Ozark: "Fire Pink" – Vikash Patel (Netflix)
 Ozark: "Wartime" – Cindy Mollo (Netflix)
 Stranger Things: "Chapter Eight: The Battle of Starcourt" – Dean Zimmerman and Katheryn Naranjo (Netflix)
 Succession: "DC" – Ken Eluto (HBO)
| style="vertical-align:top;" width="50%" | 
 Insecure: "Lowkey Trying" – Nena Erb and Lynarion Hubbard (HBO) Curb Your Enthusiasm: "Elizabeth, Margaret and Larry" – Steve Rasch (HBO)
 The Marvelous Mrs. Maisel: "A Jewish Girl Walks Into the Apollo..." – Kate Sanford and Tim Streeto (Prime Video)
 Schitt's Creek: "Happy Ending" – Trevor Ambrose (Pop TV)
 Schitt's Creek: "Start Spreading the News" – Paul Winestock (Pop TV)
 What We Do in the Shadows: "Resurrection" – Yana Gorskaya and Dane McMaster (FX)
|-
| style="vertical-align:top;" width="50%" | 
 One Day at a Time: "Boundaries" – Cheryl Campsmith (Pop TV) The Conners: "Slappy Holidays" – Brian Schnuckel (ABC)
 Will & Grace: "We Love Lucy" – Peter Beyt (NBC)
 Will & Grace: "What a Dump" – Joseph Fulton (NBC)
| style="vertical-align:top;" width="50%" | 
 Watchmen: "A God Walks into Abar" – Henk Van Eeghen (HBO) El Camino: A Breaking Bad Movie – Skip Macdonald (Netflix)
 Mrs. America: "Phyllis" – Robert Komatsu (FX)
 Watchmen: "It's Summer and We're Running Out of Ice" – David Eisenberg (HBO)
 Watchmen: "This Extraordinary Being" – Anna Hauger (HBO)
|-
| style="vertical-align:top;" width="50%" | 
 Last Week Tonight with John Oliver: "Eat Shit Bob!" – Ryan Barger (HBO) The Daily Show with Trevor Noah: "Trump's Coronavirus Address (Bloopers Included) and Trevor's Audience Tribute Song" – Mike Choi, Tom Favilla, Nikolai Johnson, Mark Paone, Erin Shannon, Catherine Trasborg, Einar Westerlund, and Robert York (Comedy Central)
 Dave Chappelle: Sticks & Stones – Jeff U'Ren (Netflix)
 Dave Chappelle: The Kennedy Center Mark Twain Prize for American Humor – Brad Gilson, Chester G. Contaoi, Jon Alloway, Pi Ware, and Brian Forbes (PBS)
 Last Week Tonight with John Oliver: "The Journey of ChiiJohn: Chapter 2" – Anthony Miale (HBO)
| style="vertical-align:top;" width="50%" | 
 Apollo 11 – Todd Douglas Miller (CNN) American Factory – Lindsay Utz (Netflix)
 Beastie Boys Story – Jeff Buchanan and Zoe Schack (Apple TV+)
 The Last Dance: "Episode 1" – Chad Beck, Devin Concannon, Abhay Sofsky, and Ben Sozanski (ESPN)
 McMillion$: "Episode 3" – Jody McVeigh-Schultz, Lane Farnham, James Lee Hernandez, Brian Lazarte, and Scott Hanson (HBO)
 Tiger King: Murder, Mayhem and Madness: "Cult of Personality" – Doug Abel, Nicholas Biagetti, Dylan Hansen-Fliedner, Geoffrey Richman, and Daniel Koehler (Netflix)
|-
| style="vertical-align:top;" width="50%" | 
 RuPaul's Drag Race: "I'm That Bitch" – Jamie Martin, Michael Roha, Paul Cross, Michael Lynn Deis, and Ryan Mallick (VH1) LEGO Masters: "Mega City Block" – Samantha Diamond, Dan Hancox, Karl Kimbrough, Ian Kaufman, Kevin Benson, Josh Young, and Jon Bilicki (Fox)
 Queer Eye: "Disabled but Not Really" – Ryan Taylor and Tony Zajkowski (Netflix)
 Survivor: "It's Like a Survivor Economy" – Michael Greer, Chad Bertalotto, Evan Mediuch, James Ciccarello, and Jacob Teixeira (CBS)
 Top Chef: "The Jonathan Gold Standard" – Matt Reynolds, David Chalfin, Mike Abitz, Eric Lambert, Jose Rodriguez, and Dan Williams (Bravo)
| style="vertical-align:top;" width="50%" | 
 Cheer: "God Blessed Texas" – Arielle Kilker, David Nordstrom, Kate Hackett, Daniel McDonald, Mark Morgan, Sharon Weaver, and Ted Woerner (Netflix) Deadliest Catch: "Cold War Rivals" – Rob Butler, Isaiah Camp, Ben Bulatao, Joe Mikan, Ralf Melville, and Alexandra Moore (Discovery Channel)
 Life Below Zero: "The New World" – Matt Edwards, Jennifer Nelson, Tony Diaz, Matt Mercer, Eric Michael Schrader, and Michael Swingler (National Geographic)
 RuPaul's Drag Race: Untucked: "The Ball Ball" – Kendra Pasker, Yali Sharon, and Kate Smith (VH1)
|}

Sound Editing

Sound Mixing

Special Visual Effects

Stunt Coordination

Technical Direction

Writing
{| class="wikitable"
|+ 
|-
| style="vertical-align:top;" width="50%" | 
 Last Week Tonight with John Oliver – Dan Gurewitch, Jeff Maurer, Jill Twiss, Juli Weiner, John Oliver, Tim Carvell, Daniel O'Brien, Owen Parsons, Charlie Redd, Joanna Rothkopf, Ben Silva, and Seena Vali (HBO) The Daily Show with Trevor Noah – Dan Amira, Lauren Sarver Means, Daniel Radosh, David Angelo, Devin Delliquanti, Zach DiLanzo, Geoff Haggerty, Josh Johnson, David Kibuuka, Matt Koff, X Mayo, Christiana Mbakwe, Dan McCoy, Trevor Noah, Joseph Opio, Randall Otis, Zhubin Parang, Kat Radley, and Scott Sherman (Comedy Central)
 Full Frontal with Samantha Bee – Samantha Bee, Pat Cassels, Kristen Bartlett, Mike Drucker, Melinda Taub, Nicole Silverberg, Joe Grossman, Sean Crespo, Mathan Erhardt, Miles Kahn, Sahar Rizvi, and Alison Zeidman (TBS)
 Late Night with Seth Meyers – Alex Baze, Jermaine Affonso, Karen Chee, Bryan Donaldson, Sal Gentile, Matt Goldich, Dina Gusovsky, Jenny Hagel, Allison Hord, Mike Karnell, John Lutz, Seth Meyers, Ian Morgan, Seth Reiss, Amber Ruffin, Mike Scollins, Mike Shoemaker, and Ben Warheit (NBC)
 The Late Show with Stephen Colbert – Ariel Dumas, Jay Katsir, Stephen Colbert, Michael Brumm, River Clegg, Aaron Cohen, Nicole Conlan, Paul Dinello, Glenn Eichler, Django Gold, Gabe Gronli, Barry Julien, Daniel Kibblesmith, Eliana Kwartler, Matt Lappin, Felipe Torres Medina, Opus Moreschi, Asher Perlman, Tom Purcell, Kate Sidley, Brian Stack, John Thibodeaux, and Steve Waltien (CBS)
| style="vertical-align:top;" width="50%" | 
 Dave Chappelle: Sticks & Stones – Dave Chappelle (Netflix) Hannah Gadsby: Douglas – Hannah Gadsby (Netflix)
 John Mulaney & the Sack Lunch Bunch – John Mulaney and Marika Sawyer (Netflix)
 Patton Oswalt: I Love Everything – Patton Oswalt (Netflix)
 Seth Meyers: Lobby Baby – Seth Meyers (Netflix)
|-
| style="vertical-align:top;" width="50%" colspan="2" | 
 Don't F**k with Cats: Hunting an Internet Killer: "Closing the Net" – Mark Lewis (Netflix)' Beastie Boys Story – Mike Diamond, Adam Horovitz, and Spike Jonze (Apple TV+)
 The Cave – Alisar Hasan and Feras Fayyad (National Geographic)
 Circus of Books – Rachel Mason and Kathryn Robson (Netflix)
 McMillion$: "Episode 1" – James Lee Hernandez and Brian Lazarte (HBO)
|}

Nominations and wins by program
For the purposes of the lists below, any wins in juried categories are assumed to have a prior nomination.

Nominations and wins by network

Ceremony order and presenters
The following categories were presented at each ceremony:

Ceremony information

The 72nd Primetime Creative Arts Emmy Awards were originally scheduled for September 12 and 13, 2020, falling a week before the main ceremony and spreading the awards across two nights as had been done in previous years. However, due to the COVID-19 pandemic, the ceremonies were moved in June to several unspecified nights in a virtual format, with a five-night plan being outlined in early August. The new format divided the ceremonies by genre as follows:
 Monday, September 14: Reality and Nonfiction
 Tuesday, September 15: Variety
 Wednesday, September 16: Scripted (Night One)
 Thursday, September 17: Scripted (Night Two)
 Saturday, September 19: "An eclectic mix of awards across all genres"
The first four ceremonies were streamed on Emmys.com via a YouTube livestream, with the fifth night airing on FXX. All of the virtual ceremonies were produced by Bob Bain Productions, and Nicole Byer served as the host for the event from the Television Academy's headquarters in North Hollywood. While events during the ceremony were called live and winners were not known until being revealed to the director, all footage was pre-taped; each nominee was asked to submit an acceptance speech in advance, with only the winners' speeches being broadcast. While the ceremony mostly proceeded without a hitch, one notable error occurred when Jason Bateman was read as the winner for Guest Actor in a Drama Series, while Ron Cephas Jones – the actual winner – was listed on screen. Other glitches included the screen listing "Need Names" instead of recognizing the hairstyling team from Hollywood'' and an incorrect graphics card for Maya Rudolph's win for Guest Actress in a Comedy Series.

Category and rule changes
Changes that affected Creative Arts categories included:
 Outstanding Informational Series or Special was changed to Outstanding Hosted Nonfiction Series or Special.
 Awards for interactive programs were realigned into the new categories of Outstanding Derivative Interactive Program, Outstanding Original Interactive Program, and Outstanding Interactive Extension of a Linear Program.
 Makeup and hairstyling awards were rearranged; the new categories were divided into period and contemporary awards, similar to costume categories.
 Category descriptions for Outstanding Structured Reality Program and Outstanding Unstructured Reality Program were revised.
 Outstanding Children's Program now limited voting to only children's programming and animation peer groups.
 Short-form programs could not exceed 17 minutes in length.
Four categories were also moved to the Creative Arts ceremony from the main ceremony: Outstanding Directing for a Variety Series, Outstanding Writing for a Variety Series, Outstanding Variety Sketch Series, and Outstanding Television Movie.

Notes

References

External links
 72nd Primetime Creative Arts Emmy Awards at Emmys.com
 
 Academy of Television Arts and Sciences website

072 Creative Arts
2020 in American television
2020 in Los Angeles
2020 awards in the United States
2020 television awards
September 2020 events in the United States